Michael Perry or Mike Perry may refer to:

Arts, entertainment, and media
Alan and Michael Perry (born 1961), miniature wargame sculptors
 Michael Perry (author) (born 1964), writer and a humorist
 Michael Perry (gardener) (born 1979), TV gardener and author
 Michael Perry (software engineer), software designer and writer
 Michael R. Perry (born 1963), American television producer, television writer and screenwriter
 Michael W. Perry, radio personality on KSSK-FM
 Mike Perry (artist) (born 1981), artist and animator
 Mike Perry (DJ) (born 1983), Swedish DJ and producer
 Mike Perry (game developer) (born 1969), game developer at Maxis and Zynga

Religion
 Michael Perry (hymnwriter) (1942–1996), English hymnwriter
 Michael Perry (priest) (1933–2015), Anglican priest and author
 Michael A. Perry (born 1954), American Franciscan friar

Sports
 Michael Perry (athlete) (born 1977), Australian triple jumper
 Michael Perry (basketball) (born 1958), American college basketball coach 
 Michael Perry (footballer) (born 1944), Australian rules player
 Michael Alexander Perry (born 1964), known as Mick Perry, English footballer
 Michael Dean Perry (born 1965), football player
 Mike Perry (fighter) (born 1991), American fighter

Others
 Michael J. Perry (born 1945), American legal scholar and writer
 Michael James Perry (1982–2010), American convicted murderer, executed in 2010
 Michael Owen Perry (born 1954), American murderer, subject of the US Supreme Court case Perry v. Louisiana
 Michael Sydney Perry (born 1934), British businessman

See also
Michael Perry Botanic Reserve, in Stonyfell, South Australia

Perry (surname)